McCown is a Goidelic surname with several possible etymological origins.

Etymology
There are several possible etymologies for McCown.  McCown is a patronymic surname, the Gaelic Mac (or Mc) meaning "son of" in English.

Mac Còmhghan 
The name Còmhghan and its variants ( Còmhan, Comhainn, Còmhain ) is derived from comh ("together") and gan-, gen- ("born"). a.k.a. Twins and is frequently associated with the surname Cowan.   The name Mac Giolla Còmhghan, translates into English as son of the servant of Comhghain.   This generally translates to mean follower of St. Comgan.  St. Comgan was the son of Cellach Cualann, brother of St. Caintigerna and uncle of St. Fillan.    One of the King of Scots, Lulach Mac Gille Coemgáin had this name.  Mac Giolla Còmhghan is frequently associated with the anglicized surname McElhone. Phonetically,  McElhone seems similar to Mac Colquhoun.

Mac Eachainn 
MacEachainn is a Pictish name of Galloway, Scotland.

Mac Eòin 
The name Eòin is a Gaelic form of John.  Mac Eoin often anglicized as (McKeon/McKeown) is thought to have derived, in some cases, from Mac Eoin Bissett.

Mac Gobhainn 
In Ireland and Scotland, the word for smith, gobha, is found in the surname MacGowan/McGowan. This surname is an Anglicised form of Mac Gobhann (Scottish Gaelic), Mac Gabhann (Irish), meaning "son of the smith".

Other possibilities 
Other possible derivations of the name may come from the Manx language word Cowan and its variants (Cowanagh, Coan, Couan) which are defined as either a shelter between two hills, or inhabitant of the plains.  In Old Irish, cúan means bay, gulf, harbour or sea.  The name Cuan can also mean a little warrior and tends to be synonymous with the names Quain, Quane, and Quan.

Clan Associations
In contemporary Scottish clan societies and at Highland games, those with the surname McCown may declare allegiance to  Clan Campbell.

Persons with the surname
Bob McCown, (born 1952) American-born Canadian, sports talk show personality
Francis Timothy McCown, also known as Rory Calhoun, (1922–1999) American, television actor
Jennie McCowen (1845–1924), American physician, writer, lecturer, medical journal editor, suffragist
John P. McCown, (1815–1879) American, Confederate States Army general
Josh McCown, (born 1979) American, professional American football player
Luke McCown, (born 1981) American, professional American football player
Randy McCown, (born 1977) American, College football player

Other 
Thick-billed longspur (Rhynchophanes mccownii), formerly known as McCown's longspur, is a small ground-feeding bird.
Starkville Park: Honors civil rights activist John McCown
McCownville, Texas: Ladonia Texas used to be named McCownville
McKownville: Heavily developed suburb of Albany County, New York

References 

Celtic-language surnames